Guwahati (formerly rendered Gauhati) is the biggest city of the Indian state of Assam and also the largest metropolis in northeastern India. Dispur, the capital of Assam, is in the circuit city region located within Guwahati and is the seat of the Government of Assam. A major riverine port city along with hills, and one of the fastest growing cities in India, Guwahati is situated on the south bank of the Brahmaputra. It is called the ''Gateway to North East India''.

The ancient cities of Pragjyotishpura and Durjaya (North Guwahati) were the capitals of the ancient state of Kamarupa.
Many ancient Hindu temples like the Kamakhya Temple, Ugratara Temple, Basistha Temple, Doul Govinda Temple, Umananda Temple, Navagraha Temple, Sukreswar Temple, Rudreswar Temple, Manikarneswar Temple, Aswaklanta Temple, Dirgheshwari Temple, Asvakranta Temple, Lankeshwar Temple, Bhubaneswari Temple, Shree Ganesh Mandir, Shree Panchayatana Temple, Noonmati, and the like, are situated in the city, giving it the title of "The City of Temples".

Guwahati lies between the banks of the Brahmaputra River and the foothills of the Shillong plateau, with LGB International Airport to the west and the town of Narengi to the east. The North Guwahati area, to the northern bank of the Brahmaputra, is being gradually incorporated into the city limits. The Guwahati Municipal Corporation, the city's local government, administers an area of ,. At the same time, the Guwahati Metropolitan Development Authority (GMDA) is the planning and development body of Greater Guwahati Metropolitan Area. Guwahati is the largest city in Northeast India.

The Guwahati region hosts diverse wildlife including rare animals such as Asian elephants, pythons, tigers, rhinoceros, gaurs, primate species, and endangered birds.

Etymology 
Guwahati derives its name from the Assamese word "Guva" derived from the Sanskrit word Guvaka, meaning areca nut and its plant and "Hati" meaning rows, the rows of areca nut trees.

History

Ancient history
Epigraphic sources place the capital of Kamarupa kingdom in Guwahati. The 10th-12th century Kalika Purana mention that Kamrup was inhabited by strong Kirata people. As per the legends constructed in the Yogini Tantra, the tank Dighalipukhuri located in the heart of the city was dug by King Bhagadatta of Kamrup on the occasion of the wedding of his daughter Bhanumati with Duryodhan. Located within Guwahati is the Shakti temple of Goddess Kamakhya in Nilachal hill (an important seat of Tantric and Vajrayana Buddhism), the ancient and unique astrological temple Navagraha in Chitrachal Hill, and archaeological remains in Basistha and other archaeological locations of mythological importance.

The Ambari excavations trace the period of the city of Guwahati between the 2nd century BCE and the 1st century CE, in the Shunga-Kushana period of Indian history. Descriptions by Xuanzang (Hiuen Tsang) reveal that during the reign of the Varman king Bhaskaravarman (7th century CE), the city stretched for about 30 li. Archaeological evidence by excavations in Ambari, and excavated brick walls and houses discovered during construction of the present Cotton College's auditorium suggest the city was of economic and strategic importance until the 9th–11th century CE.

Medieval history

Forces of Muhammad bin Bakhtiyar Khalji suffered a disastrous defeat in the hands of Raja Prithu in Kamrup during Tibetan expedition. The entire army of Bakhtiyar Khalji was defeated by native forces, which forced him to retreat.

For short periods Guwahati was a Mughal station at the time of their occupation of Kamrup (1633-59, 1662-69, 1679-
81 A.D.). After Battle of itakhuli, Guwahati permanently came under the seat of the Borphukan, the civil-military authority of the Lower Assam region appointed by the Ahom kings. The Majindar Baruah, the personal secretary of the Borphukan, had his residence in the present-day deputy commissioner's residence.

From the time of 
Gadadhar Singha the ahom kings paid their attention to building several temples 
in various religious sites at GUwahati: Kamakhya, Aswakranta, Sukreswar, Umananda, Dirgheswari, Vasisthasram and adorned its different entry passes with masonry gates.

The Mughals invaded Assam seventeen times but were defeated by the Ahoms in the Battle of Itakhuli and the Battle of Saraighat in outskirts of Guwahati.There was an ancient boatyard in Dighalipukhuri, probably used by the Ahoms in medieval times.

Medieval constructions include temples, ramparts, and other structures in the city.

Colonial history
During the 17th century Guwahati was taken and retaken by Muslims and Ahoms eight times in fifty years, but in 1681 it became the residence of the Ahom governor of lower Assam, and in 1786 the capital of the Ahom raja. On the cession of Assam to the British in 1826 it was made the seat of the British administration of Assam, and so continued till 1874, when the headquarters were removed to Shillong in the Khasi hills.

Modern history

The Gauhati High Court (formerly known as the High Court of Assam) was promulgated on 1 March 1948 by the then Governor General of India, Lord Mountbatten, in accordance with the Government of India Act 1935. It became effective on 5 April 1948 and was initially established for the Province of Assam. R.F. Lodge was the inaugural Chief Justice of the Gauhati High Court, taking office on 5 April 1948.

The Saraighat Bridge, notable for its role in connecting Northeast India with the rest of the country, was constructed between 1959 and 1962 by the Hindustan Construction Company at a cost of approximately Rs 10.6 crore at the time. It was completed in September 1962, and the first engine crossed it on 23 September 1962.

In 1972, due to separation of Meghalaya from Assam, the capital of Assam was moved to Dispur, a neighbourhood in Guwahati from the erstwhile capital of Shillong.

Geography 

The Brahmaputra river flows to the north of the metropolis. The city is bordered on the south by the foothills of the Shillong plateau and to the east by the Amchang Wildlife Sanctuary. The Bharalu River, a tributary of the Brahmaputra, flows right through the heart of the city. To the south-west of the city lies Dipor Bil, a permanent freshwater lake with no prominent inflows apart from monsoon run-off from the hills to the south of the lake. The lake drains into the Brahmaputra,  to the north, and acts as a natural stormwater reservoir for the city. There are also multiple hills within the city limits.

Urban morphology 

Guwahati's 'urban form' radiates from a central core with growth corridors radiating and extending towards the south, east, and west. In the past few decades, southern Guwahati areas such as Ganeshguri, Beltola, Hatigaon, Six Mile, and Panjabari began forming a southern sub-center surrounding the capital complex at Dispur. The core area consists of the old city with Pan Bazaar, Paltan Bazaar, Fancy Bazaar and Uzan Bazaar, with each area facilitating unique urban activities.

Among the city corridors, the most important is the corridor formed along the Guwahati-Shillong (GS) Road towards the south (almost  from the city-center). The GS Road corridor is an important commercial area with retail, wholesale and commercial offices developed along the main road; it is also a densely built residential area in the inner parts. The capital complex of Assam at Dispur is situated in this corridor. This corridor has facilitated the growth of a southern city sub-center at Ganeshguri, along with other residential areas to the south developed during the past few decades.

The corridor links residential and historically important areas such as Nilachal Hill (Kamakhya), Pandu, and Maligaon (headquarters of Northeast Frontier Railways) before it separates into two – one towards North Guwahati via the Saraighat Bridge and the other continuing west towards LGB International Airport via Gauhati University (Jalukbari). There are also many river ports/jetties along this corridor.

Highway NH-37, which encircles the city's southern parts and links the southern corridor in Noumile to the western corridor in Jalukbari is currently supporting rapid development. Similarly, the VIP Road linking Zoo Road with the eastern corridor and recently completed Hengerabari-Narengi Road are also supporting massive residential development to the east.

Guwahati is one among 98 Indian cities proposed to become Smart Cities under a project embarked on by Ministry of Urban Development, Government of India.

Climate
Guwahati has a humid subtropical climate (Köppen climate classification Cwa), falling just short of a tropical savanna climate (Köppen climate classification Aw).

Infrastructure

The city has a comparatively high quality of life. A 2006 survey ranked Guwahati 17th among all the large and medium-sized Indian cities. The city provides competitive residential and working environments with beautiful landscapes, pleasant climate, modern shopping areas, modern apartments, and bungalows, and considerably developed social infrastructure. A centrally funded four-lane, ambitious East-West Corridor will pass through Guwahati and connect all the state capitals of Northeast India. Completion of the project will boost the vital upliftment of the whole region.

The city still needs attention to improve its infrastructure. Funding from the Asian Development Bank is providing assistance to improve Guwahati's transportation infrastructure along with a substantial amount from Jawaharlal Nehru National Urban Renewal Mission (JNNURM) for its development.

Administration and governance

Dispur, the capital of Assam, lies in Guwahati. The passing of the North Eastern (Reorganization Areas) Act in 1971 by the Indian Parliament accorded Meghalaya the status of a full-fledged state. After the creation of Meghalaya as a separate state, Shillong continued to be the joint capital of both Assam and Meghalaya. However, in 1972, the Government of Assam decided to shift the capital to Dispur. Accordingly, the first sitting of the Budget Session of the Assam Legislative Assembly was held at Dispur on 16 March 1973. Dispur houses the Secretariat of Assam Government, the Assam Assembly House, the National Bank for Agriculture and Rural Development (NABARD) Regional Office, the North Eastern Development Finance Corporation Ltd (NEDFi) House and the Guwahati Tea Auction Centre (GTAC).

Guwahati Municipal Corporation is the local body responsible for governing, developing and managing the city. It is divided into 31 municipal wards.

Guwahati consists of four assembly constituencies: Jalukbari, Dispur, Gauhati East and Gauhati West, all of which are part of Gauhati (Lok Sabha constituency).

Police
Guwahati is the headquarters of Assam Police.

The city is under the Police Commissionerate of Guwahati headed by the Commissioner of Police, Guwahati. It is divided into three districts: East Police District, Central Police District, and West Police District, each headed by a Deputy Commissioner of Police. Each police district consists of officers, not below the rank of Assistant Commissioner of Police, functioning as executive magistrates within a said metropolitan area.

Judiciary

Guwahati is the principal seat of the Gauhati High Court. It acts as the High Court of Assam and also of Nagaland, Mizoram and Arunachal Pradesh with their outlying benches of Kohima, Aizawl and Itanagar, respectively. Gauhati High Court came in effect from 5 April 1948. It initially had its sittings at Shillong but was shifted to Gauhati from 14 August 1948.

Guwahati also houses the Court of the District and Sessions Judge, Kamrup established in 1920. It is a lower court of the district judiciary having territorial jurisdiction over the greater Guwahati area only.

Problems

Increase in population 
In recent years, Guwahati has experienced rapid population growth due to migration for education and employment opportunities. This population increase has led to undesirable expansion of the city and has resulted in various collateral problems, such as the rise in the number of slums. It is projected that the population of Guwahati will reach 1.5 million by 2035, up from an estimated 1.1 million in 2020.

Inflation 
One of the economic problems that the citizens of Guwahati have to put up with is the hike in prices of many essentials, chiefly vegetables, poultry, and fish. The prices of these commodities keep escalating at an inordinate rate because of which the buyers find it difficult to buy these items. Vegetables are transported into Assam from West Bengal, Bihar, Uttar Pradesh, Delhi, Maharashtra and Meghalaya and the truckers en route have to pay considerable amount of money as tax at various check posts. It is one of the causes of rise in prices of vegetables in the markets of Guwahati. The prices of locally available vegetables and fruits undergo large markup because of transportation expenses grounds, besides intra-State check posts taxes. In addition to these, the wholesale dealers, as well as the retail sellers, augment the prices of the commodities according to their own desires.

The price of poultry, mainly chicken, that reaches the city markets from places like Chaygaon and Barpeta have been soaring rapidly because of similar factors. There has been steep rise in the price of fish as well, the prominent varieties of which being Rohu ("Rou"), Catla ("Bahu"), Walking catfish ("Magur") and Monopterus ("Kuchia") among many others.

The COVID-19 pandemic further exacerbated inflation, causing food prices to rise.

Flooding 
According to experts, urban flooding in Guwahati in the near future is expected to worsen to the point where residents of certain areas may be forced to relocate. Since the beginning of the 21st century, the alteration of drainage channels and wetlands due to rapid urbanization has exacerbated the problem of flooding.

Professor Abani Kumar Bhagawati of Gauhati University stated that since before there were sufficient wetlands to absorb rainwater and channels to carry excess water to the Brahmaputra, the city did not experience floods. However, human interference has disrupted the natural topography, leading to the current situation where "just half an hour of rain" can cause flooding in the city. Encroachment and concretization, which reduce open areas for natural water absorption, are the primary causes of floods according to Bhagawati.

Demographics

Population

Guwahati is one of the fastest-growing cities in India. 
Guwahati has a population of 957,352 as of the 2011 census. 
Population of Guwahati in 2021 is estimated to be 11 lakhs (approx). It is estimated that Guwahati metro will house 2.8 million residents by 2025.
Below Graph shows Population of Guwahati (1950-2040):-

Literacy and sex ratio
The percentage of the child population (0-14) in Guwahati was 9.40% in 2011. The average literacy rate was stated to be 91.47% with male literacy at 94.24% and female literacy at 88.50%. The sex ratio was recorded to be 933 females per 1000 males and child sex ratio to be 940 girls per 1000 boys.

Languages 

According to the 2011 census, there were around 957,352 people living in Guwahati city, of which around 558,532 population spoke Assamese, 198,544 spoke Bengali, 138,056 speaks Hindi, 16,331 speaks Bodo , 4.72% speaks other minority languages like Odia, Manipuri, Nepali, Telugu, Punjabi and others.

Education 

Guwahati is the central educational hub of Northeast India. Among the esteemed institutions is the Indian Institute of Technology Guwahati (IIT), an autonomous institute dedicated in the field of technical studies in India. Cotton University, erstwhile Cotton College is yet another century-old institution in the fields of Science and Arts.

Guwahati has numerous educational institutes and colleges such as Gauhati University, Cotton University, Srimanta Sankaradeva University of Health Sciences, Assam Science and Technology University, Dakshin Kamrup College, Dakshin Kamrup Girls' College, Gauhati Commerce College, Arya Vidyapeeth College (Autonomous), K.C. Das Commerce College, Handique Girls College, Indian Institute of Technology, Guwahati, Indian Institute of Information Technology, Guwahati, NETES Institute of Technology and Science Mirza, B. Borooah College, Dispur College, Regional Dental College, Guwahati, N.E.F Law College, National Law University and Judicial Academy, Gauhati Medical College and Hospital, Government Ayurvedic College, Guwahati, Assam Engineering College, Assam Institute of Management, Assam Don Bosco University, Assam Down Town University, Royal Global University, Lakshmibai National Institute of Physical Education NE Regional Centre, Tata Institute of Social Sciences, Guwahati Campus and Krishna Kanta Handiqui State Open University, National Institute of Pharmaceutical Education and Research, Guwahati and Institute of Advanced Study in Science and Technology.

There are various private schools too like Delhi Public School, Sanskriti the Gurukul, Holy Child School, St. Mary's English High School, YWCA English High School and Faculty Higher Secondary School.

Economy
Pandu, located on the banks of the Brahmaputra at the western part of the city, is an ancient urban area that acted as the chief military base for the Ahoms against external invasions. Due to extensive fortification ('Gorh') surrounding Pandu, it acts as a natural river harbor and is formally called Gar-Pandu. Pandu port falls under Dhubri-Sadiya National Waterway-2 and is an important terminal and transit point for goods and cargo as well as passenger and tourist vessels. Construction of both low-level and high-level jetty of fixed terminal, capable of handling container vessels, has been completed and has further enhanced revenue generation for the city.

The manufacturing sector in Guwahati contributes a substantial share to the economy of the city. Petroleum manufacturing is an important economic activity in the city. The Guwahati Refinery is the most important manufacturing industry in the city. Located at Noonmati, the refinery was set up by the Indian Oil Corporation Limited as the first public sector refinery of India as well as the refinery of Indian Oil since 1962. It was built with an initial crude processing capacity of 0.75 million tonnes per year at the time of its commission which was gradually increased to 1.0 million tonnes per year. It produces various products and supplies them to the other northeast states and also beyond to Siliguri through the Guwahati-Siliguri pipeline. The various products produced by the refinery include Liquefied Petroleum Gas (LPG), Kerosene Oil, Turbine Fuel (aviation use), Motor Spirit, High-Speed Motor Diesel, Light Diesel Oil, and Raw Petroleum Coke. There is also an LPG bottling plant in the city.

Tea manufacturing and processing is another important activity of Guwahati. Assam is one of the highest tea-producing areas in the world, contributing 80% of India's export and 55% of the country's total tea production. So high is the production of tea in Assam that it is the biggest industry in the state. The headquarters of the Assam Branch Indian Tea Association (ABITA) is located at Guwahati. The Guwahati Tea Auction Centre (GTAC), located adjacent to the capital complex at Dispur, is the world's largest CTC tea auction center and the second largest in terms of total tea auctioned. The inaugural sale took place on 25 September 1970 and the first lot of tea was auctioned at the price of  42.50 which, during those days, was a significant achievement. In the month of August 2019, a kilogram of Maijan Orthodox Golden tea sold for a record-setting price of  70,501 at the Guwahati Tea Auction Centre.

Many centralised, private and international banks have set up their branches in the city with the Reserve Bank of India having one of its own at Pan Bazaar.

Transport

Air
With all major domestic and international airlines flying into Guwahati, it is the eleventh busiest airport in India in total passenger traffic. Daily and weekly flights are available to Delhi, Mumbai, Kolkata, Chennai, Visakhapatnam, Bengaluru, Hyderabad, Ahmedabad, Lucknow, Jaipur, Kochi, Bangkok, Paro, Kathmandu etc.

Rail

The city of Guwahati and the northeastern region falls under the Northeast Frontier Railway (NFR) Zone of the Indian Railways, the headquarters of which is in Maligaon, near Nilachal Hills, in the northwest of the city. The Guwahati railway station, located in Paltan Bazaar area of Guwahati, is the busiest railway station in the city. It lies along the Barauni-Guwahati Line and Guwahati–Lumding section, categorised as an A-1 railway station under Lumding railway division.

There are four more railway stations in the city – the Kamakhya Junction for passenger and freight services, the New Guwahati railway station (near Noonmati) for only freight services, Narangi railway station and Azara railway station. There are regular trains connecting Guwahati to and from other major cities of the country. Rajdhani Express, Poorvottar Sampark Kranti Express, Brahmaputra Mail, Kamrup Express, Northeast Express, Saraighat Express and Garib Rath are some significant trains running to and from Guwahati. The train with the longest route in India, Vivek Express, which runs from Dibrugarh in Upper Assam to Kanyakumari in the southern tip of India passes through Guwahati.

Road

National Highway 27 connects Guwahati with the states West Bengal, Bihar and rest of India. This highway connects Guwahati with Silchar in Barak Valley Assam and further connecting the city to the states of Meghalaya, Manipur, Mizoram and Tripura. National Highway 17 from Sevoke in West Bengal terminates in Jalukbari and connects Guwahati with the major cities of Dhubri and Cooch Behar. National Highway 15 and its several secondary roads runs through both the banks of River Brahmaputra and connects the Guwahati with the cities of Tezpur, Jorhat, Dibrugarh in Upper Assam and the states of Arunachal Pradesh and Nagaland.

Public transportation is well developed in the city. Buses are the major means of public transport in Guwahati. The state-owned Assam State Urban Transport Corporation, a subsidiary of Assam State Transport Corporation (ASTC) and private operators provide the city bus services within the city. ASTC also operates the Volvo air-conditioned bus services within the city as well as to the LGBI airport. In addition to this, there are a number of private bus operators that regularly run day and night bus services from Guwahati to neighbouring towns and cities within Assam and the other Northeastern States. Rupnath Brahma Inter State Bus Terminus (ISBT), located at Betkuchi area on NH-37, is the most significant terminal cum transit point for buses plying between Guwahati and other destinations in Assam and Northeast India. The areas of Adabari and Paltan Bazaar also act as nodal points in providing bus services to towns and cities in Assam and adjoining states.

A metro rail project has also been planned to relieve the hectic traffic conditions on the streets.

Guwahati has also seen a rise in the usage of cycling as a mode of transport and as per some unofficial estimates, there was almost a 50% increase in the number of people who took up cycling in the wake of COVID-19. The city has an active cycling community and is amongst the few Indian cities that has a Bicycle Mayor and a Junior Bicycle Mayor.

Water
The Inland Water Transport Department is headquartered at Pandu port in Guwahati. The waterways transportation services in Guwahati are used for transporting bulk goods and cargo, and for movement of passenger and tourist vessels. Ferry services are available for transportation of people from different ports along the Brahmaputra to Pandu port.

Sports

Guwahati features the multi-purpose Nehru Stadium which hosts mostly football and cricket located in the R.G. Baruah Sports Complex, one of the oldest in the city. It comprises the Kanaklata Indoor Stadium (for badminton),  swimming pool and tennis courts. The North-East Frontier Railway Stadium of Maligaon, the Sports Authority of India (SAI) complex of Paltan Bazaar and the Judges Field are other prominent sporting venues of the city.

The sporting infrastructures especially constructed for the 33rd National Games in 2007 include the main stadium at Sarusajai— Indira Gandhi Athletic Stadium, Dr. Zakir Hussain Aquatic Complex, and the Karmabir Nabin Chandra Bordoloi A.C. Indoor Stadium. Other new sports structures include Maulana Md. Tayabullah Hockey Stadium at Bhetapara, Deshbhakta Tarun Ram Phookan Indoor Stadium at Ulubari, Rajiv Gandhi Indoor Stadium at Amingaon, Chachal Tennis Complex and the Tepesia Sports Complex. The renovated sports complexes include Ganesh Mandir Indoor Stadium at Khanapara, Rudra Singha Sports Complex at Dispur and Gauhati University Sports Stadium. The Indira Gandhi Athletic Stadium was also the main venue of the 2016 South Asian Games, which was held from 5 to 16 February 2016. The stadium also hosted the Himalayan Region Games in 2017 and the FIFA U-17 World Cup in India in 2017. 

Guwahati is home to the professional football club NorthEast United FC of Indian Super League. They play their home matches at the Indira Gandhi Athletic Stadium. It presents one of the finest football atmospheres in India.

The international cricket venue Assam Cricket Association Stadium at Barsapara, is the home of Assam cricket team. It is the largest cricket stadium in Northeast India with seating capacity of 40,000 and 2nd largest in East India. It hosted an India vs Australia T20I match in 2017 in its international debut. The first ODI in the stadium was held in 2018 between India and West Indies.

Media & telecommunications

Assamese daily newspapers published from the city are Dainik Agradoot, Asomiya Pratidin, Asomiya Khabar, Amar Asom, Dainik Janambhumi, Janasadharan, Niyomiya Barta, Dainik Asam, Dainandin Barta and Gana Adhikar. English dailies are The Assam Tribune, The Sentinel,  The Telegraph, The Times of India and Eastern Chronicle. Eclectic Northeast Magazine is a leading Guwahati-based monthly Northeast magazine with an online version. G Plus is the only English weekly tabloid published from Guwahati.

The state-owned television broadcaster DD Assam provides free-to-air satellite television services. Guwahati-based 24-hour regional satellite news channels include News Live, DY 365, Pratidin Time, Prag News, Assam Talks and News18 Assam-North East.

The Guwahati Radio Station of state-owned All India Radio was inaugurated on 1 July 1948 as Shillong-Guwahati Station. The Headquarter of the Shillong-Guwahati Station was shifted from Shillong to Guwahati in 1953. It is a full-fledged Regional broadcasting station with three channels; the Guwahati A & B Channels are AM Channels, and the CBS Channel is an FM Channel. The other FM stations include 92.7 BIG FM, Radio Gup-Shup 94.3 FM, Red FM 93.5 and Radio Mirchi. Telecom services are BSNL, Airtel, Vodafone Idea and Jio.

Notable places of worship

Notable people
 

 Nabakanta Barua, poet and academician
Dipankar Bhattacharjee, Indian badminton player and Olympian
Barsha Rani Bishaya, Assamese film actor
Gaurav Bora. footballer
Ashmita Chaliha, Indian badminton player
Utpal Das, Assamese film actor
Somdev Devvarman, tennis player
Zubeen Garg, singer
Shrinjan Rajkumar Gohain, Indian chess player
Arnab Goswami, journalist
Mamoni Raisom Goswami, novelist and academician
Reema Kagti, director and screenwriter
Durgabar Kayastha, medieval littérateur
Papon, singer and composer
Sagarika Mukherjee, singer and actress
Abu Nechim, cricketer
Nayyara Noor, singer
Riyan Parag, cricketer
Bhabendra Nath Saikia, novelist, short story writer and film director
Himanta Biswa Sarma, current Chief Minister of Assam
Jayanta Talukdar, Indian archer and Olympian
Shiva Thapa, boxer and Olympian

See also
 Assam State Museum
 Brahmaputra Valley Film Festival
 Dhirenpara
 History of Beltola
 List of colleges affiliated to Gauhati University
 List of people from Western Assam 
 Saraighat Bridge
 Silasindurighopa
 Varman dynasty

References

Bibliography

External links

 The Government of Assam
 The District of Kamrup

 
Cities and towns in Kamrup Metropolitan district
Former capital cities in India
River ports
Smart cities in India